Venom is the fifth studio album by Welsh heavy metal band Bullet for My Valentine. The album was released on 14 August 2015 via RCA Records, their second and last album under the label. It is the first album by the band since the departure of bassist Jason "Jay" James, which was announced in February 2015 while the band was recording the album. Jamie Mathias was announced as his replacement on 18 May 2015, along with the album's title, release date and release of the album's first single, "No Way Out". This would also be the final album with founding drummer Michael "Moose" Thomas who parted ways with the band officially in 2017.

"No Way Out" and "Broken" were premiered live during the band's headlining performance at the Camden Rocks Festival in London on 30 May 2015. The second and third singles, "You Want a Battle? (Here's a War)" and "Army of Noise", were released on 29 June and 17 July 2015, respectively. Another two songs, "Playing God" and "Worthless" were released respectively on 10 and 13 August 2015. The whole album was made available for streaming on YouTube on 14 August 2015.

Jamie Mathias is credited as a band member but did not perform on this album; Tuck recorded all bass guitar parts instead. Mathias later said in an interview that he hopes to be involved in future band projects.

Reception

Venom received mixed reviews from music critics. At Metacritic, which assigns a rating out of 100 to reviews from mainstream critics, the album has an average score of 58/100 based on 8 reviews, indicating "mixed or average reviews". British magazine Kerrang! awarded the album 4 stars, saying that "Venom has injected a whole new life into the British metal heroes." Alternative Press and AllMusic both gave the album 3.5 stars. However, a negative review came from Bradley Zorgdrager of Exclaim! who gave the album a 3 out of 10. The critic wrote that "the lack of quality choruses leaves something to be desired. While their heaviest output won't win over any elitists, fans will also have trouble finding something here to sing along to."

The album was included at number 37 on Rock Sounds top 50 releases of 2015 list.

Track listing

Personnel

Bullet for My Valentine
Matt Tuck - vocals, rhythm guitar, bass (uncredited)
Michael "Moose" Thomas - drums, additional vocals on "You Want a Battle? (Here's a War)"
Michael "Padge" Paget - lead guitar, additional vocals on "You Want a Battle? (Here's a War)"
Jamie Mathias - bass (credited, but does not perform), backing vocals

Additional personnel
Matt Tuck - production on "Raising Hell"
Michael "Padge" Paget - production on "Ace of Spades"
Jay James - bass and vocals on all Japan and Best Buy live bonus tracks
Colin Richardson - production, mixing
Carl Bown -  production, mixing, additional vocals on "You Want a Battle? (Here's a War)"
Jim Pinder - additional engineering
Josh Gilbert - co-production on "The Harder the Heart (The Harder It Breaks)" and "Skin"
Shane Blay - co-production on "The Harder the Heart (The Harder It Breaks)" and "Skin"
Alex Robinson - assistant engineering, co-mixing, vocals recording on "Ace of Spades"
Ted Jensen - mastering
Dan Brown, Austin Dickinson, Ryan Richards, Stefan Whiting, Jack Vallier, Henry Boeree, Rebekah Power, Emma Gorman, Lauren Metccalf, Alice Williams, Andrew Humphries & Ginnie Breakwell - gang vocals on "You Want a Battle? (Here's a War)"
 Martyn "Ginge" Ford - production, mixing on "In Loving Memory (Demo Version)", engineering on "Raising Hell"

Charts

References

Other sources

 

Bullet for My Valentine albums
2015 albums
RCA Records albums